Porter Riley Charleston (January 8, 1904 – June 11, 1986) was an American Negro league pitcher between 1927 and 1935.

A native of Mexia, Texas, Charleston made his Negro leagues debut in 1927 with the Hilldale Club. He played five seasons with Hilldale, and went on to play for the Baltimore Black Sox and Philadelphia Stars. Charleston died in Chester, Pennsylvania in 1986 at age 82.

References

External links
 and Baseball-Reference Black Baseball stats and Seamheads

1904 births
1986 deaths
Baltimore Black Sox players
Hilldale Club players
Philadelphia Stars players
Baseball pitchers
Baseball players from Texas
People from Mexia, Texas
20th-century African-American sportspeople